"Yo Soy Boricua, Pa'que tu lo sepas!" is a song composed in 1995 by Joel Bosch a.k.a. Taíno.

"Yo soy Boricua, pa'que tu lo sepas" is yelled out by many Puerto Ricans around the world, at specific events. To date, the song identifies itself as a social statement made by Puerto Ricans. It is chanted at the Puerto Rican Day  Parade held in New York City every year, political events, protests and sporting events.

Documentary
A 2006 documentary by the same name was directed by Rosie Perez, a Nuyorican actress. It chronicles the history of Puerto Rico, from pre-Columbian times to the present, and traces the 20th century migration of Puerto Ricans to New York City.

References

External links
ASCAP Work ID: 550177656 ISWC:  T0702136795
Us Copyright
 Trademark

Puerto Rican songs
Songs about Puerto Rico
Puerto Rican culture in the United States